Hell Divers is a 1932 American pre-Code black-and-white film from Metro-Goldwyn-Mayer starring Wallace Beery and Clark Gable as a pair of competing chief petty officers in early naval aviation.

Hell Divers was officially Gable's first "starring" role and filmed before he grew his trademark mustache.  Gable had appeared in a minor supporting role in another Beery film, The Secret Six, in April 1931. For Gable, Hell Divers was not a pleasant experience since he was again billed beneath Beery, an actor he personally disliked. Four years later, Gable would be billed over Beery in the lavish epic China Seas, one of only four films during the sound era in which Beery did not receive top billing. Other actors appearing include Conrad Nagel, Dorothy Jordan, Marjorie Rambeau, and Marie Prevost. An uncredited Robert Young appears near the end of the film in a speaking role as Graham, a pilot.

Plot
Leading Chief Petty Officer "Windy" Riker is a veteran aerial gunner of a Navy Helldiver dive bomber and the leading chief of Fighting Squadron One, about to go to Panama aboard the  aircraft carrier. He loses his five-year title of "champion machine gunner" after young C.P.O. Steve Nelson joins the squadron. Windy, notorious for using his fists to enforce discipline, is charged by local police with wrecking a Turkish bath. Windy is saved from arrest, however, when Lieutenant Commander Jack Griffin, skipper of the squadron, intervenes on his behalf. Griffin and his second-in-command, Lieutenant "Duke" Johnson, agree that Nelson is the best candidate to replace Windy as he ponders retirement.

The chiefs engage in friendly rivalry until the squadron practices a new dive-bombing technique and Steve becomes a hero, saving the base from being accidentally bombed by climbing out on the wing of his dive bomber to hold in place a bomb that failed to release. Feelings turn bitter when Steve contradicts Windy's explanation of the accident and Windy punches him in resentment. Windy is dressed down by Duke when the officer sees the punch. When Steve's sweetheart, Ann Mitchell, visits him, he proposes marriage to her, but Windy uses a practical joke to get even with Steve. Unaware that Ann is Steve's fiancée and not simply a girl he is trying to impress, Windy bribes an old acquaintance, Lulu, to pretend to be Steve's outraged lover. Ann leaves upset and will not listen to Steve's denials.

Griffin loses an arm following a mid-air collision at night. The accident occurs when the aircraft are returning from delivering the admiral to his flagship the Saratoga before the squadron embarks. Griffin is retired and replaced in command of Fighting One by Duke Johnson.  Windy becomes Johnson's gunner when the squadron flies to the ship. During a bombing exercise off Panama, Windy misplaces his code book and delays the takeoff of the squadron. As punishment, he is assigned to supervise a work party when the ship docks, missing liberty and keeping him from seeing Mame Kelsey (Rambeau), the woman in Panama he wants to settle down with after retirement.

Steve, who knows Mame, encounters her on the dock and shares her carriage, but Windy hears about it and sneaks into town. Mame tries to convince Steve to patch up his differences with Windy, then promotes peace between them when Windy shows up at her hotel. Having a drink together in the bar, however, Windy starts a brawl. Steve tries to help him avoid the local police but Windy is thrown in jail. As the Saratoga passes through the Panama Canal, Mame bails Windy out of jail and he catches up to it by stealing a boat. For his transgressions, the captain of the Saratoga reduces Windy one rate from chief. Windy is disciplined at "Captain's Mast" and reduced to Aviation Machinist's Mate 1st Class for leaving his post without authorization, absent without leave, and missing ship. Steve reluctantly becomes leading chief.

During a mock battle, Steve's aircraft crashes near a rocky island, killing the pilot and leaving Steve with a broken leg. Duke and Windy land to rescue Steve, but Duke suffers a head injury and Windy has to save both. They have only a radio receiver and cannot be found in the fog. Steve and Windy become friends while waiting for rescue. Windy writes Ann a note confessing what he did with Lulu. After four days, Duke's condition worsens, Steve develops blood poisoning, and they hear on the radio that the Saratoga is leaving. Windy tries to save them by flying them out in Duke's dive bomber, with Duke in the rear cockpit and Steve riding on the wing. Despite the fog, they find the aircraft carrier, but crash on landing and Windy is fatally injured. By his last request, Windy is buried at sea as a missing man formation flies overhead.

Cast

Production

Based loosely on the earlier war epic, What Price Glory? (1926), "Lt. Comdr. Frank Wead, U.S.N. (Ret.)" is credited for the film's story. Wead was himself later portrayed by John Wayne in John Ford's movie biography The Wings of Eagles, in which footage of Hell Divers appears. Ford regular Jack Pennick has a small role in both, appearing uncredited in Hell Divers as a recruit sailor.

Principal aerial photography under the helm of cinematographer Charles A. Marshall took place in 1931 at North Island Naval Air Station in San Diego, California. The aircraft used in the film were the Curtiss F8C-4 variant, the first production variant to bear the nickname "Helldiver". A total of 25 F8C-4 aircraft were transferred to the U.S. Marine Corps shortly after the release of Hell Divers. The production received full cooperation from the US Navy Department, not only featuring the song (uncredited but considered the unofficial song of the US Navy), "Anchors Aweigh" (1906) (written by Charles A. Zimmerman, lyrics by Alfred Hart Miles and R. Lovell) in the opening credits but also a dedication to the naval aviators who made the film possible.

While a small number of miniatures stood in for the real aircraft, as well in a mock battle by airships attacking the Saratoga, the majority of the aerial scenes directed by Marshall, featured the actual Helldivers of VF-1B. Real events were woven into the film; footage of the historic 1928 landing of the airship USS Los Angeles aboard the carrier was also incorporated into the story.  In addition to sequences filmed aboard the Saratoga at sea and in the Panama Canal, Hell Divers was filmed at the NAS North Island, as one of the first of a series of naval epics filmed there.

Release
The film had a sneak preview in San Bernardino on October 29, 1931, but was not released until January 16, 1932.

Reception
Hell Divers was received well both critically and with audiences. Reviews focused on the exciting aerial sequences. Mordaunt Hall, in The New York Times, effused over the "magnificently photographed production, one that includes naval air stunts and impressive 'landing' feats", while dismissing the plot as "inconsequential". Much later reviews note the "boisterous" interplay between notorious scene-stealer Beery and Gable; while, for aircraft enthusiasts, the film is considered an aviation classic.

Box-office
According to MGM records, Hell Divers earned $1,244,000 in the U.S. and Canada and $917,000 elsewhere, resulting in a profit of $458,000.

References
Notes

Citations

Bibliography

 Dolan, Edward F. Jr. Hollywood Goes to War. London: Bison Books, 1985. .
 Donald, David, ed. Encyclopedia of World Aircraft. Etobicoke, Ontario: Prospero Books, 1997. .
 Farmer, Jim. "Hollywood goes to North Island NAS." The Making of the Great Aviation Films, General Aviation Series, Volume 2, 1989.
 Hardwick, Jack and Ed Schnepf. "A Viewer's Guide to Aviation Movies". The Making of the Great Aviation Films, General Aviation Series, Volume 2, 1989.
 Maltin, Leonard. Leonard Maltin's Movie Guide 2009. New York: New American Library, 2009 (originally published as TV Movies, then Leonard Maltin’s Movie & Video Guide), First edition 1969, published annually since 1988. .
 Orriss, Bruce. When Hollywood Ruled the Skies: The Aviation Film Classics of World War II. Hawthorne, California: Aero Associates Inc., 1984. .

External links

 
 
 
 

1932 films
1930s adventure drama films
1932 drama films
American aviation films
American black-and-white films
American adventure drama films
Films directed by George Hill
Metro-Goldwyn-Mayer films
Films about the United States Navy
1930s English-language films
1930s American films
Films shot in San Diego